Tiger Cave may refer to:

 Tiger Cave Kiln, China
 Tiger Cave (India)
 Tiger Cave Temple, Thailand